Couëtron-au-Perche is a commune in the department of Loir-et-Cher, central France. The municipality was established on 1 January 2018 by merger of the former communes of Souday (the seat), Arville, Oigny, Saint-Agil and Saint-Avit.

See also 
Communes of the Loir-et-Cher department

References 

Communes of Loir-et-Cher
Populated places established in 2018
2018 establishments in France